Big Bend of the Madesi Valley is a census-designated place (CDP) and the indigenous homeland of Madesi tribe, located in Shasta County, northeastern California. It is named for a major change in course of the Pit River.

Its population is 79 as of the 2020 census, down from 102 from the 2010 census.

History

Native Americans
For several thousand years prior to the 19th century, Big Bend was the heart of the territory of the Madesi tribe (pronounced Mah-day-see) tribe (or "band") of Pit River Native Americans. The Madesi is one of nine bands (also called "tribelets") that spoke the Achomawi language. (Early anthropologists mistakenly called all nine bands in the language group "Achomawi," although only one of the bands was actually called Achomawi.)

The Madesi band's territorial region included Big Bend and the surrounding area of the Lower Pit River (Ah-choo'-mah in the Madesi dialect, which has few or no speakers still living), and several of its tributaries, such as Kosk Creek (An-noo-che'che) and Nelson Creek (Ah-lis'choo'-chah). The main village of the Madesi was on the north bank of the Pit River, east of Kosk Creek, and was called Mah-dess', or Mah-dess' Atjwam (Madesi Valley), and was directly across the river from the smaller villages that surrounded the hot springs on the river's south bank, which were called Oo-le'-moo-me, Lah'-lah-pis'-mah, and Al-loo-satch-ha.

The Madesi people enjoyed great abundance of food sources, which mainly consisted of acorns, deer, salmon, and other fish from the river.

Euro-American settlers
The Big Bend area is so remote and isolated that the Madesi was one of the last indigenous peoples of California to be invaded and pushed out of their ancestral homeland.  

As white settlers began to come to Big Bend in the 1860s, few Madesi were left in the area, and the newcomers began to claim the stolen land as their own. By the 1890s, Big Bend was becoming a small quiet town of white settlers, centered around the hot springs. It was originally called Elena (1890) by the Euro-Americans settlers, and then changed to Henderson, (1906) before they began calling it "Big Bend" (1922).

Early white settlers built a log hotel with a post office and a saloon just above the main hot springs. Many visitors around the turn of the 20th-century came to Big Bend to soak in the hot springs, seeking the reputed healing qualities of the hot mineral water baths.

The dam construction brought thousands of jobs and people to Big Bend. This included engineers, builders, tunnel diggers (around 2000 hard-rock miners), and service workers to the area. Big Bend saw a "boom and bust" cycle, and the population was declining by the late 1940s, after the dam work was completed. Although the maintenance of the hydroelectric facilities and a large commercial logging industry still require numerous employees, almost all of the people working in such jobs live outside of Big Bend, contributing further to the population decline.

The population of Big Bend was only 102 people in the 2010 census, apparently the lowest number of residents since the 1860s.

Geography
Big Bend is located at  (41.019803, -121.907881).

The community is situated on a long bend in the Pit River which is the longest tributary to the Sacramento River. The Pit River (traditionally called Achoma) is one of only three rivers that crosses the Cascades mountain range and drains into the Pacific Ocean.  Before the dams were built, the Pit River hosted the third largest Salmon run on the west coast of the US.  From Big Bend is a striking view of Chalk Mountain (called Too-le-pah-ah-te Ah-ko by the Madesi tribe) which has a natural exposed slide feature of diatomaceous earth.  The slide is locally called the "White Buffalo," since it resembles a white bison.  Another prominent mountain hovering over the town of Big Bend is called Bald Peak (called Ma-how-mah-day Ah-ko by the Madesi tribe), which has dozens of cold water springs, creating numerous creeks that feed into the Pit River, a spring-fed, or a "free stone" river.

Demographics

2010
The 2010 United States Census reported that Big Bend had a population of 102. The population density was 17.5 people per square mile (6.8/km2). The racial makeup of Big Bend was 85 (83.3%) White, 0 (0.0%) African American, 10 (9.8%) Native American, 0 (0.0%) Asian, 0 (0.0%) Pacific Islander, 1 (1.0%) from other races, and 6 (5.9%) from two or more races.  Hispanic or Latino of any race were 2 persons (2.0%).

The Census reported that 102 people (100% of the population) lived in households, 0 (0%) lived in non-institutionalized group quarters, and 0 (0%) were institutionalized.

There were 58 households, out of which 8 (13.8%) had children under the age of 18 living in them, 15 (25.9%) were opposite-sex married couples living together, 4 (6.9%) had a female householder with no husband present, 4 (6.9%) had a male householder with no wife present.  There were 4 (6.9%) unmarried opposite-sex partnerships, and 0 (0%) same-sex married couples or partnerships. 34 households (58.6%) were made up of individuals, and 11 (19.0%) had someone living alone who was 65 years of age or older. The average household size was 1.76.  There were 23 families (39.7% of all households); the average family size was 2.65.

The population was spread out, with 11 people (10.8%) under the age of 18, 13 people (12.7%) aged 18 to 24, 19 people (18.6%) aged 25 to 44, 42 people (41.2%) aged 45 to 64, and 17 people (16.7%) who were 65 years of age or older.  The median age was 50.3 years. For every 100 females, there were 131.8 males.  For every 100 females age 18 and over, there were 139.5 males.

There were 90 housing units at an average density of 15.5 per square mile (6.0/km2), of which 33 (56.9%) were owner-occupied, and 25 (43.1%) were occupied by renters. The homeowner vacancy rate was 0%; the rental vacancy rate was 0%.  51 people (50.0% of the population) lived in owner-occupied housing units and 51 people (50.0%) lived in rental housing units.

2000
As of the census of 2000, there were 149 people, 70 households, and 38 families residing in the CDP. There were 106 housing units at an average density of 18.5 per square mile (7.2/km2). The racial makeup of the CDP was 83.22% White, 8.72% Native American, 1.34% Asian, 3.36% from other races, and 3.36% from two or more races. Hispanic or Latino of any race were 3.36% of the population.

There were 70 households, out of which 21.4% had children under the age of 18 living with them, 42.9% were married couples living together, 4.3% had a female householder with no husband present, and 45.7% were non-families. 41.4% of all households were made up of individuals, and 12.9% had someone living alone who was 65 years of age or older. The average household size was 2.13 and the average family size was 2.97.

In the CDP, the population was spread out, with 23.5% under the age of 18, 4.7% from 18 to 24, 21.5% from 25 to 44, 36.2% from 45 to 64, and 14.1% who were 65 years of age or older. The median age was 45 years. For every 100 females, there were 119.1 males. For every 100 females age 18 and over, there were 128.0 males.

The median income for a household in the CDP was $23,750, and the median income for a family was $23,000. Males had a median income of $33,750 versus $40,625 for females. The per capita income for the CDP was $16,183. There were 50.0% of families and 45.2% of the population living below the poverty line, including 60.0% of under eighteens and 25.0% of those over 64.

Politics

Natural attractions

Hot springs
Big Bend is known in the Northern California region for its geothermal hot springs. There are several hot spring sources on the Big Bend Hot Springs property along the Pit River. Privately owned land containing hot springs is expected to open for public tourism.

Pit River
The Pit River is a "free stone river" and provides excellent fishing for McCloud River redband trout.

The Pit River has had occasional white water level releases from the dams to provide white water rafting with Class 4 and Class 5 rapids.

A highly scenic gravel road follows the Pit River upstream from Big Bend to Highway 89 near McArthur-Burney Falls Memorial State Park.

Iron Canyon Reservoir
Iron Canyon Reservoir, located near Big Bend, impounds water diverted from the McCloud River and contains Rainbow Trout and Brown Trout. This reservoir provides an opportunity for canoeing and float tubing. The reservoir is in the Shasta-Trinity National Forest and has two campgrounds, one administered by the US Forest Service and one by Pacific Gas and Electric Company.

References

External links
Pit River Tribe
Big Bend Hot Springs
Iron Canyon Reservoir
Indian Springs Telecom

Census-designated places in Shasta County, California
Pit River
Pit River tribes
Bodies of water of Shasta County, California
Hot springs of California
Census-designated places in California